Space Milkshake is a 2012 Canadian science fiction comedy film directed and written by Armen Evrensel. Its cast features Billy Boyd, Robin Dunne, Kristin Kreuk and Amanda Tapping.

Plot
A mutant rubber ducky terrorizes four workers who are stranded on a sanitation space station. Meanwhile, Earth is inexplicably devoid of life. The crew must now work together to defeat the mutant rubber duck and figure out the strange device that has also appeared on the ship.

Production

Filming was conducted between 14 November – 3 December 2011 at Canada Saskatchewan Production Studios in Regina.

Release
The world premiere was held at the London MCM Expo on 26 October 2012. Actors Robin Dunne and Billy Boyd were at the premiere for a question and answer session.

The film premiered on Canadian television channel The Movie Network on 8 February 2013 and aired on Movie Central in Canada starting on 22 March 2013. The film also screened at film festivals in February 2013; the film also screened at the Armageddon Expo in Melbourne, Australia on 19 October 2013 and Auckland, New Zealand on 26 October 2013.

References

External links
 Space Milkshake at Foundation Features
 
 

2012 films
English-language Canadian films
Canadian science fiction comedy films
Films shot in Saskatchewan
2010s English-language films
2010s Canadian films